() in France, is a senior superior military rank across various military and security institutions with history dating back well beyond the 18th century.

The official rank and designation of Major of France is unique.

While the rank functions of Major in France, can be similarly compared to that of a Sergeant Major, it is higher (rank of Major) than a Chief Warrant Officer, and similar to a Master Chief (depending on the service branch of the respective country); the rank of Major is still different.

Major was a senior superior Officer rank first, with a history of various military traditions in various corps, then recently in time became attached to the sub-officer (non-commissioned) corps as of 2009.

The rank of Major of the French Armed Forces can be the closest equivalent in terms of authenticity, and even still different, to the American referral of Mustang officers, since the rank of "Major" was already a superior Officer (a superior combat military officer rank ascended through the enlisted corps by service or promotions in combat units until 2009) which was part of the "Corps of Majors", situated between the French Officer Corps and the French Non-Commissioned Officer Corps. However, the history rank of the Majors of France is still very different.

In the French Armed Forces, the official rank and referral of Major ) included the same rank designation across the board, this time however as of 2009, attached  to the non-commissioned ranks (sub-officer corps) of the French Army, the ranks of the French Navy, the ranks of the French Air Force and ranks of the National Gendarmerie.

The title is also often associated with another rank, which can be that of the general or a senior warrant officer.

Types

Major General 
In many armed forces, the rank of Major General or general-major is the second rank of the general officer corps. The rank came from the abbreviation of the rank "Sergeant"-Major General, the junior lower rank to that of "Lieutenant"-General, the latter referring also to the contemporary rank of Général de division. The rank of Lieutenant-General in France has also; similarly to Major, a long history dating back to the Ancien Régime. Lieutenant General of the Armies Lieutenant General of the Naval Armies and Major of France were military rank orders of senior authority of the French Army, including also the French Navy which commanded over on behalf of the King or Governor.

History of the rank in France

Officiers Supérieurs, Superior Officer 
In the Armies of France of the Ancien Régime, the Major was the second of the colonel charged with the administrative works of the regiment, as well as the commandment of a strong influential position after the Governor and the Lieutenant of the King.

During the Napoleonic Period, the rank of lieutenant-colonel was replaced with the rank of Major. The designation of Major or Medical Major, with category rank sub-classes (1st Class Major, 2nd Class Major, Aide-Major, Deputy Aide-Major) designated until 1928 a Military Medic.

In the French War Navy of the 18th century, a rank of Major of the Vessel existed briefly and was situated between the rank of Ship-of-the-line lieutenant and Ship-of-the-line captain. The position rank of Major also designated the general officer in charge of maintaining the materials and security of a port or naval base, the position was known as the "Major" General of the Arsenals. In a squadron, the Squadron Major, was a general officer as Ship-of-the-line captain, and upheld the function of the general staff headquarters of the squadron.

The actual organization of the Armies instituted, first in the military hierarchy, a function (not a rank) of Major General for the ensemble of the Armies or each one of the:  Major General of the Armies, Major General of the French Army, Major General of the French Air Force, Major General of the French Navy (a Vice-Amiral since 1966, Deputy French Naval Chief), Major General of the National Gendarmerie; these functions are respectively subordinated to the Chief of the General Staff Headquarters of the Armies CEMA, subsequently, passing accordingly to the Chief of Staff of the French Army CEMAT, the Chief of Staff of the French Navy CEMM, the Chief of Staff of the French Air Force CEMAA, and to the Director General of the National Gendarmerie.

Equally, exposed here forth in the Sous-Officiers section, the rank of Major, is heir to the former rank of Major-Adjudant, is the most elevated rank in the non-commissioned officers of the French Army, the French Air Force, French Navy, and Gendarmerie Nationale. Until 2009, there existed the Corps of Majors which was situated between the French Officers Corps and the French Non-Commissioned Officer Corps. In the French Navy, this was related to the Corps of Majors of the Equipment of the Fleet, since the demotion (following a national political policy to reduce the number of corps in the public function...), a Major in the French Navy is no longer a Major of the Equipment of the Fleet, but became a Major in the Petty Officer Corps of the French Navy. However, the insignia of the Major was kept and is represented by 2 crossed anchors, symbols of equipments of the Fleet.

Sous-Officers, Sub-Officers 
The actual designation of "Major" in the French Armed Forces corresponds to a contraction of the composed term "Adjudant-Major": the rank is the most elevated rank in the Sub-officer corps; which existed since 1972. A rank of "Sergeant Major" existed until 1971, under various form designations, and in certain cases, that rank could come close to the actual rank of Major. The first Major of France was Raymond Delaveau and the youngest Major of France would become his son, Thierry Delaveau.

Major of France 
In 1972, simultaneously at the creation of the rank, was created the Corps of Majors in order to enable non-commissioned officers to occupy the equivalent posts of Officers (An Officer Corps below the rank of Commandant or equivalent across the member armed forces). This intermediary corps between the officers and that of the non-commissioned officers, actually included only one rank: that rank function was dissolved in 2009.

Since this date, the rank of Major is the most senior elevated rank, attached  this time however to the non-commissioned officer corps of the French Army, the French Air Force, the National Gendarmerie The Major of the Gendarmerie, is the most elevated rank of Non-Commissioned Officer Corps of the French Navy.

To ascend to the rank of Major, the Chief warrant officer or the Principal Master must pass a series of professional selection tests dites  "", ESP in abbreviation. Based on the rule and regulations of the Armies, it is possible for them to apply for the recruitment dits "" (at choice), on the condition of having sufficient years of senior service in their designated rank.

The rank insignia for the French Army, the National Gendarmerie, the French Air Force feature a red border joined by a braid. For the arms dites à pied (on foot), the rank insignia and braid is yellow (accordingly retaking the insignia of Adjudant-Chef) as portrayed. For the mounted arms, heir to the cavalry corps, they are white. For the French Navy, the rank insignia is that of a Principal Master surmounted by two golden anchors.

Majors of France 
The Majors of France are officially addressed and designated as follows:

 French Navy
 Major of the French Navy
 French Army 
 Major of the French Army
 Major of the Foreign Legion
French Air Force
 Major of the French Air Force

 National Gendarmerie including Departmental, Mobile, the French Republican Guard, main security branches, military police and specialized formations such as the GIGN. 
 Major of the National Gendarmerie

The same official designation applies to the subordinate ranks (except for subordinate ranks of Major in the French Navy) of Major, those of Chief Warrant Officer (Principal Master in the French Navy) and Warrant Officer, particularly, specialized combatant units of the French Armed Forces.

The rank Major ceased to exist with the Fire services in France since April 20, 2012.

Law enforcement
Police
 Major of the Police (in the French National Police which includes several directorates, inspection, services, various security groups, and specialized units such as the RAID).

Prisons
 Major of the Penitentiary Administration (in the French Penitentiary Administration Directorate)

Fire service
Decree Law n° 2012-519 of April 20, 2012 abolished the rank of Major in the Fire services in France.

in other countries

See also 
 Governor (Les Invalides, France)
 Lieutenant-General (France)
 Ranks in the French Army
 Ranks in the French Navy
 Ranks in the National Gendarmerie
 Ranks in the French Air Force
 Ranks in the National Police
 Sergeant Major
 Major

Notes

References

Military ranks of France